Theclopsis lydus  is a Neotropical butterfly in the family Lycaenidae. It is found in  Surinam, French Guiana, Venezuela, Ecuador, Peru, Bolivia and Brazil.

References

Theclinae